Armando Manuel Aurelio Ortega Carrillo, known as Maestro Armando Ortega, was a Mexican musician, the Director of Coro de la Escuela Secundaria y de Bachilleres de Orizaba (ESBO).  His maternal great-grandfather was the philanthropist Don Manuel Carrillo Tablas, who served many times as mayor of Orizaba, Veracruz, Mexico. His maternal grandfather (Manuel Carrillo Iturriaga) was also a member of the Mexican Legislature at the turn of the 20th century. His paternal grandfather was the illustrious Professor Don Aurelio Ortega y Placeres, considered one of the most brilliant educators of public instruction the state of Veracuz, Mexico produced.  His father was the renowned poet and educator, Professor Don Aurelio Ortega Castañeda, who baptized the city of Orizaba with the title of "Nuestra Señora de los Puentes"("Our Lady of the bridges").

Early life
Armando Manuel Aurelio Ortega Carrillo was born into one of the great families of Spain and the New World. He was a brilliant, very cultured and educated man. From a young age he exhibited enormous artistic and musical talent. At the age of 14 he was already known for his music ability and compositions.  As his talents became known, he went to study with the Jesuit Fathers in nearby Puebla and then at a boarding school in San Luis Potosí, and then in Mexico City with the Marist Fathers. Part of his formation also included studying under Ramón Noble and Uberto Zanolli. He wrote some of the most beautiful poems on the valley of Orizaba, and was often sought out to compose some for important events and ceremonies.

Career
He was a brilliant, very cultured and educated man.  More than this, he was an artist.  To his students he imparted his gift and knowledge of music and would explain in great detail the significance of the symphonies of Beethoven and Mozart.

A large collection of his works have been donated to the City of Orizaba and are housed in the Archives of the city's Cultural Center.  Some of his great works include sacred music: Agnus Dei, Pater Noster, Salve Regina, Sanctus, Gloria, Aleluya, the musicals: El Establo, Madrigal Nupcial; his opera/ballet: Esperanza (La Quinceañera), the opera Eugenia Op.3; his ballet: the birth of Venus, the musical comedy: La Portera; Balada de las Violetas y baladas de los Jazmines to name of few.

Many of his works were performed by the stars of his age: the tenor Raphael J. Sevilla, the first ballet dancer Luis Mauricio Caracas, the singer Betty Fabila, Maestro Ramón Noble, the Baritone Fernando Vivanco Barceló, and performances from the Maestro himself, who had a wonderful voice too.

Maestro Armando Aurelio was also known for his drawings and paintings of his beloved Orizaba, Veracruz.  His father, the distinguished poet and teacher Don Aurelio Ortega Castañeda was an obvious influence on Maestro Armando.

On the 13 of August 2008 the Maestro was honored for his contributions to Mexican culture and the arts at the Teatro de la Llave in Orizaba, Veracruz, Mexico.

Selective works
Operas
Las Golondrinas; La Vengadora (1952); Eugenia (1954); Sombras (1958); Esperanza (La Quinceñera) (1968).
Ballets
El Nacimiento de Venus (1958); Ruinas; Idilio de las Libélulas (1962), En el Establo, for soloists, narrator, 2 trumpets, percussion, organ, guitars, and string orchestra (1972); Ahauializápan, for reciter, tenor, mixed chorus, actress, piano, percussion, and string orchestra (1973).

Chamber music; large number of songs; choruses

Death
As with many talented artists, Maestro Armando's life was cut short at the age of 36. His faithful mother, Doña Guadalupe María Carrillo Limón viuda de Ortega and niece Norma Alicia María Arenas Ortega (now a carmelite cloistered nun: Sr. Teresita del Niño Jesús y de la Sta. Faz), were at his bedside when he died. He was reentered in the city's cemetery, in the family plot in 2008, following a citywide ceremonial event.

Video Links of Maestro Armando's work
Vals Esperanza Op. 6 No. 5 - performed by the Orchestra Clasico of Orizaba, under the direction of Armando Lopez Macip, 22 September 1994 Teatro Llave (Orizaba, Veracruz, Mexico).

Ofretorio - performed by Coro & Orchestra Clasico of Orizaba, under the direction of Armando Lopez Macip, 7 October 1993 Teatro Llave (Orizaba, Veracruz, Mexico).

Gloria Patri - performed by Coro & Orchestra Clasico of Orizaba, under the direction of Armando Lopez Macip, 1993 Teatro Llave (Orizaba, Veracruz, Mexico).

Legado - performed by Greta y Oleg. Dueto de violin y piano, Saturday 12 August 2017.

Nocturno a Aiaza - performed by Greta y Oleg. Dueto de violin y piano, Saturday 12 August 2017.

Nocturno a Emma - performed by Greta y Oleg. Dueto de violin y piano, Saturday 12 August 2017.

Ópera Eugenia del compositor orizabeño Raúl Armando Ortega Carrillo (1936-1973).- Al piano, Oleg Sifuentes de 15 años de edad, en el Teatro Llave de Orizaba, Veracruz
https://www.youtube.com/watch?v=1hrnc3chn1w&ab_channel=GretayOleg%3ADuetodeViol%C3%ADnyPiano

Notes

External links
 http://armandoortegacarrillo.blogspot.com
 http://www.oem.com.mx/elsoldeorizaba/notas/n811602.htm
 https://web.archive.org/web/20100125220415/http://www.todossomosorizaba.org/archivomunicipal/sitio/0000009b6f0e31502/0000009b6f0f63b37/index.html
 http://www.plumalibre.com.mx/index.php?option=com_content&view=article&id=282%3Ahomenaje-postumo-a-armando-ortega&Itemid=115
 https://books.google.com/books?id=S02rvzz60rkC&pg=PA635&lpg=PA635&dq=Armando+Ortega+Carrillo&source=bl&ots=WJLfLkwlyx&sig=kqwneQ4tSmYzHTESefV_ggrXXbg&hl=en&sa=X&ei=qZFUU9-SBNioyASkuYDgCA&ved=0CFMQ6AEwBQ#v=onepage&q=Armando%20Ortega%20Carrillo&f=false

1970 deaths
Mexican artists
1936 births